Jiří Liška (born 14 August 1952 in Písek) is a Czech former handball player who competed for Czechoslovakia in the 1976 Summer Olympics.

In 1976 he was part of the Czechoslovakian team which finished 7th in the Olympic tournament. He played two matches and scored one goal.

External links
 Profile

1952 births
Living people
Czechoslovak male handball players
Czech male handball players
Olympic handball players of Czechoslovakia
Handball players at the 1976 Summer Olympics
Sportspeople from Písek